The 1922–23 Loyola Ramblers men's basketball team represents Loyola University Chicago during the 1922–23 college men's basketball season. The ramblers were led by first-year head coach Jack Tierney. The team had finished the season with an overall record of 5–7.

Schedule

|-

References

Loyola Ramblers men's basketball seasons
Loyola Ramblers
Loyola Ramblers
Loyola Ramblers